Syncopacma larseniella is a moth of the family Gelechiidae. It is found in most of Europe.

The wingspan is about 12 mm. Adults are on wing in June and July.

The larvae feed on Lotus corniculatus.

References

External links
 Syncopacma larseniella at UKmoths

Syncopacma
Moths of Europe
Moths described in 1957